Remuna (Sinhala:රෙමුණ, Tamil:ரெமுண) is a town in the Kalutara District, Western Province of Sri Lanka.

On the northern outskirts of the town is a small lake, Remuna Lake.

Education 
It has a provincial school, Remuna Maha Vidyalaya, which provides classes from grade 1 to 13.

Accommodation 
 Lotus Grand View Hotel

References 

Populated places in Kalutara District